Bowna is a locality in the South East part of the Riverina, New South Wales, Australia.

Geography 
Bowna is situated by road, about 7 kilometres (4.3 miles) south west of Mullengandra and 18 kilometres (11.2 miles) east of Table Top.

History 
The former village of Bowna was inundated by the Hume Reservoir but the locality and community outside the village still exist.

Bowna Post Office opened on 1 May 1869 and closed in 1994.

Sports & Recreation
The Bowna Football Club was established in 1911 and they played some friendly against other local towns up until 1915. The club was re-established in 1920 after World War Two. Bowna were runner's up to St. Patrick's FC in the 1921 Albury B. Grade Football Association premiership. 
Bowna were once again runners up in the Albury B. Grade FA premiership in 1922, this time to the Lavington Football Club. After being minor premiers in the Albury B. Grade FA for the third successive year, Bowna once again lost the premiership, this time to Jindera in 1923, after kicking 2.18 - 30 to Jindera's 5.3 - 30 in the grand final.

Bowna FC competed in the Albury & Border Football Association in 1925 & 1926, before going into recess in 1927, Bowna then competed in the Central Hume Football Association in 1928, before permanently folding up as a club after the 1928 football season.

Notes and references

Towns in the Riverina
Towns in New South Wales